The 2002 Volta a Catalunya was the 82nd edition of the Volta a Catalunya cycle race and was held from 17 June to 23 June 2002. The race started in Sant Jaume d'Enveja and finished in Barcelona. The race was won by Roberto Heras of the U.S. Postal Service team.

Teams
Sixteen teams of up to eight riders started the race:

 
 
 
 
 
 
 
 
 
 
 
 
 
 
 
 Itera

Route

General classification

References

2002
Volta
2002 in Spanish road cycling
June 2002 sports events in Europe